Mary Bell was born on July 28, 1840 in Hillsboro, Ohio. She was a nurse and hospital matron in the Civil War.

Civil War service 
Bell left Ohio in September 1863 to join the Civil War effort. Her work began with her husband A.O. Hartley, who was a hospital steward, at Covington Barracks in Kentucky. While the two were in camp, there were outbreaks of diseases such as smallpox and spotted fever. In November, Bell was ordered to Munfordsville, Kentucky where she was soon appointed matron of a hospital by its head surgeon. Part of her duties included taking special care of the patients' diets, often poor. Bell remained at this location until May 1864, when she went to a Jacksonville hospital as troops moved to the front.

After the war 
Ultimately, Bell's service in the Civil War lasted over three years. Her husband did not survive the war; he was killed while performing his duties in Chattanooga, Tennessee. After the war, Bell taught for a year at Fisk University in Nashville, Tennessee as well as at other institutions for the following three years. Bell later relocated to Albion, Michigan.

References 

1840 births
People from Hillsboro, Ohio
Women in the American Civil War
Year of death missing
American Civil War nurses
American women nurses